Sislej Xhafa (born 1970 in Peja, Kosovo) is an Kosovar contemporary artist, based in New York.

In a Hatje Cantz Verlag monograph about the artist, art critic Guido Molinari writes "The condition of relentless traveler, throughout the West and beyond, allows Sislej Xhafa to keep in constant touch with current social, economic and aesthetic shifts and pour these back into his own works. The relationship between him and these international mutations is void of any rhetoric or politically correct solutions. It takes shape, rather, through the development of complex, but mainly light, conceptual strategies. Approaching humor at times, by means of a clear-cut point of view reversal or unexpected elaboration on a simple stereotype, the work offers an insight into the core of social unease without triggering rejection mechanisms. Xhafa's aim, indeed, is to give our minds tiny rushes of energy, without the deadlock of excess shock value." 

He is represented by Galleria Continua, San Gimignano / Beijing / Le Moulin.

Exhibitions

Xhafa has exhibited widely, including: 

 Italian Pavilion of the 55th Venice Biennale Vice Versa Venice Biennale, Venice, Italy
 21st Century Museum of Contemporary Art, Kanazawa Borderline: Collection Exhibition II, Kanazawa, Japan (2013)
 MADRE Museum of Contemporary Art Donna Reggina Still Untitled, Naples, Italy (2012)
 François Pinault Foundation The World Belongs to You, Palazzo Grassi, Venice, Italy
 Hardau City Park Y, Zürich, Switzerland
 The Power Plant Rearview Mirror, Toronto, Ontario, Canada (2011)
 PRISM Misericordia, West Hollywood, California, United States
 MAXXI Spazio. Dalle collezioni di arte e architettura, Rome, Italy
 Il Museo Privato. La passione per l'arte contemporanea nelle collezioni bergamasche GAMeC, Bergamo, Italy
 Röda Sten 2705 Baci… Göteborg (2010), MART Rovereto; Museo di Arte Moderna e Contemporanea di Trento e Rovereto, Language and Experimentations
 PAC Padiglione d'Arte Contemporanea, Milano Ibrido. Genetica delle forme
 DEPO Indefinite Destinations, Istanbul, Turkey
 MADRE Barock, Naples, Italy (2009)
 Havana Biennial, Havana, Cuba
 Modern Art Oxford Transmission Interrupted, Oxford, England
 Gwangju Biennale, Gwangju, South Korea
 Museum of Contemporary Art Detroit Business As Usual, Detroit, Michigan, United States
 Schirn Kunsthalle Frankfurt All-Inclusive. A Tourist World, Frankfurt, Germany (2008)
 Istanbul Museum of Modern Art Time Present, Time Past, Istanbul, Turkey
 Göteborg International Biennial for Contemporary Art Rethinking Dissent, Gothenburg, Sweden
 Mori Art Museum All About Laughter Humor in Contemporary Art, Tokyo, Japan (2007)
 PERFORMA05 performance biennial, New York (2005)
 I Bienal de Arte Contemporáneo de Sevilla, Fundación BIACS, La alegria de mis sueños, Monasterio la Cartuja de Santa María de las Cuervas, Seville, Spain
 The Renaissance Society,  New Video, New Europe, Chicago, Illinois, United States
 Contemporary Art Museum St. Louis, St. Louis, Missouri, United States
 Tate Modern, London, England
 Stedelijk Museum Amsterdam, Amsterdam, Netherlands
 North Dakota Museum of Art, Grand Forks, North Dakota, United States
 Fundació 'la Caixa' la Sala Montcada, Barcelona, Spain
 Haifa Museum of Art, Haifa, Israel (2004)
 Palais de Tokyo, Paris, France (2003)
 Gwangju Biennale, Pause, Gwangju, South Korea (2002)
 Istanbul Biennial, Egofugal, Istanbul, Turkey
 Stedelijk Museum voor Actuele Kunst (S.M.A.K.), Casino, Ghent, Belgium
 PS1, Uniform, Queens, New York City, New York, United States (2001)
 Manifesta III, Ljubljana, Slovenia
 Stedelijk Museum voor Actuele Kunst (S.M.A.K.), Over the Edges, Ghent, Belgium (2000)
 Venice Biennale (1997, 1999 and 2005)

Awards
 Hardau City Park Y, Zürich; Supported by City of Zürich, ZHDK and IFCAR 2009-2011 
  "Axis of Silence"  in collaboration with Contemporary Art Fund of the City and Canton of Geneva (Fmac and FCAC) Plaine de Plainpalais; Geneva 2008
 Fondazione Pistoletto, Biella 2001
 Fondazione Querini Stampalia, Premio Querini- Furla per l'Arte, Venice 2000
 Onufri National Gallery, Tirana 1999

Notes

References
"Biennale 2013: Sislej Xhafa", Vogue Italia. 
"Italian Pavilion in the 55th International Art Exposition of the Venice Biennale - Vice versa -  The Exhibition Project", 1F mediaproject
Urs Steiner, Neue Zürcher Zeitung, 2 July 2012.
Adi Kälin, Neue Zürcher Zeitung, 24 September 2011.
http://www.albinfo.ch/sq/node/81790
"The most expensive key I’ve ever owned opens the doors to a world of trash (not that I’m complaining)", Time Out Istanbul, June 12, 2012.
http://www.darsmagazine.it/gormley-buren-xhafa-galleria-continua/
http://artforum.com/picks/section=eu&mode=past#picks31076
http://frieze-magazin.de/archiv/kritik/sislej-xhafa/?lang=en
http://www.tagesanzeiger.ch/zuerich/stadt/Wie-ein-Kosovare-Zuerich-bereichern-will/story/28637795

Smith, Roberta, "Performance Art Gets Its Biennial", The New York Times, November 4, 2005. 
Povoledo, Elisabetta, "Contemporary work has unlikely home", The New York Times, February 21, 2006.
GENOCCHIO, BENJAMIN. The New York Times, August 3, 2007. "Theater of Cruelty"
The Free Library by Farlex. Artforum International, May 1, 2001. Openings Sislej Xhafa.
Povoledo, Elisabetta, "Contemporary work has unlikely home", International Herald Tribune, Tuesday, February 21, 2006.

External links

http://www.phaidon.com/store/art/cream-3-9780714843117/
http://www.artbook.com/catalog--art--monographs--xhafa--sislej.html
http://findarticles.com/p/articles/mi_m0268/is_9_39/ai_75914284/
http://www.mocadetroit.org/past-exhibitions.html 
http://www.sternberg-press.com/index.php?pageId=1222

http://www.theartnewspaper.com/articles/Silvio-set-in-sand/20209
 "Axis of Silence" one of the 13 luminous installations of the Neon Parallax public art project on the Plaine of Plainpalais, Geneva.

1970 births
20th-century sculptors
21st-century sculptors
American people of Albanian descent
Artists from Brooklyn
Kosovo Albanians
Living people
People from Peja
Postmodern artists
Albanian artists
Video artists